Anthony William Brownless (born 28 January 1967) is a former Australian rules footballer and radio and television media personality who represented  in the Australian Football League (AFL) during the 1980s and 1990s.

Early life
Brownless was born and raised in Jerilderie, a rural town in New South Wales. He first played football for his local team, the Jerilderie Football Club, when it was part of the Murray Football League. He boarded for three years in Kilmore, Victoria, at Assumption College, one of Australia's most renowned "football nurseries", a school which has a strong tradition of producing footballers who have gone on to play in the AFL. In 1984, his final year at the school, Brownless kicked 155 goals for the school team.

Career

VFL/AFL
Geelong asked Brownless to come and train, but instead he chose to return home to Jerilderie to be with family and friends and play a season of senior football before going to Geelong. During the 1985 season, he kicked 148 goals for the Jerilderie senior team while working as a farmhand. Jerilderie made it to the grand final but lost. Brownless kicked six of the team's nine goals despite having injured an ankle in the semi-final.

Brownless moved to Geelong in time for the 1986 VFL season and began working as a groundsman at Kardinia Park. He said that playing for Geelong was a natural progression for him because of the town's rural atmosphere:
It's really like a big country town and the club's a lot like a country club. You're all behind one another and you're all pretty close. It's a good feeling.
 
Brownless made his senior VFL debut in Round 1, 1986 and quickly made a name for himself as a strong full-forward, winning the Cats' best first year player award that year. He went on to play 198 games and kick 441 goals, putting him fifth in Geelong's all-time goalkicking list, behind Gary Ablett (1021), Doug Wade (834) Tom Hawkins (545) and Steve Johnson (452).

One of Brownless' fondest memories was kicking a goal after the siren against Footscray in their 1994 qualifying final. With Geelong trailing by one point, he marked the ball within scoring range with just seconds left and kicked a goal to send Geelong through to the next stage of the finals. While the Cats eventually made it to the grand final, they lost that match. Brownless played in four losing grand final teams with Geelong.

Brownless "retired“ in 1997 at 30 years of age, although the reason for the retirement was because he wasn't required at the club for the 1998 AFL Season.

Brownless has the record for most goals in a game at the Gabba, with 11.

State of Origin
Brownless first played State of Origin in 1988 for New South Wales. Playing in the State of Origin Carnival that year, he kicked three goals in the tournament, two in the first against South Australia and one in the second against Western Australia. In 1993 he again played in the State of Origin Carnival, being selected for NSW/ACT against Victoria. With Wayne Carey and John Longmire in the side, Brownless played at centre half back. In 1995 he kicked five goals and was named in the best players for Allies in a win over Western Australia.

Statistics

|- style="background-color: #EAEAEA"
! scope="row" style="text-align:center" | 1986
|style="text-align:center;"|
| 16 || 14 || 32 || 16 || 112 || 50 || 162 || 80 || 0 || 2.3 || 1.1 || 8.0 || 3.6 || 11.6 || 5.7 || 0.0
|-
! scope="row" style="text-align:center" | 1987
|style="text-align:center;"|
| 16 || 14 || 30 || 22 || 112 || 48 || 160 || 75 || 20 || 2.1 || 1.6 || 8.0 || 3.4 || 11.4 || 5.4 || 1.4
|- style="background-color: #EAEAEA"
! scope="row" style="text-align:center" | 1988
|style="text-align:center;"|
| 16 || 7 || 14 || 7 || 44 || 21 || 65 || 28 || 6 || 2.0 || 1.0 || 6.3 || 3.0 || 9.3 || 4.0 || 0.9
|-
! scope="row" style="text-align:center" | 1989
|style="text-align:center;"|
| 16 || 26 || 46 || 34 || 228 || 120 || 348 || 143 || 19 || 1.8 || 1.3 || 8.8 || 4.6 || 13.4 || 5.5 || 0.7
|- style="background-color: #EAEAEA"
! scope="row" style="text-align:center" | 1990
|style="text-align:center;"|
| 16 || 22 || 35 || 22 || 241 || 143 || 384 || 122 || 21 || 1.6 || 1.0 || 11.0 || 17.5 || 6.5 || 5.5 || 1.0
|-
! scope="row" style="text-align:center" | 1991
|style="text-align:center;"|
| 16 || 20 || 81 || 54 || 223 || 72 || 295 || 142 || 13 || 4.1 || 2.7 || 11.2 || 3.6 || 14.8 || 7.1 || 0.7
|- style="background-color: #EAEAEA"
! scope="row" style="text-align:center" | 1992
|style="text-align:center;"|
| 16 || 24 || 79 || 46 || 213 || 100 || 313 || 141 || 16 || 3.3 || 1.9 || 8.9 || 4.2 || 13.0 || 5.9 || 0.7
|-
! scope="row" style="text-align:center" | 1993
|style="text-align:center;"|
| 16 || 11 || 20 || 14 || 100 || 43 || 143 || 51 || 7 || 1.8 || 1.3 || 9.1 || 3.9 || 13.0 || 4.6 || 0.6
|- style="background-color: #EAEAEA"
! scope="row" style="text-align:center" | 1994
|style="text-align:center;"|
| 16 || 17 || 34 || 21 || 153 || 45 || 198 || 84 || 11 || 2.0 || 1.2 || 9.0 || 2.6 || 11.6 || 4.9 || 0.6
|-
! scope="row" style="text-align:center" | 1995
|style="text-align:center;"|
| 16 || 24 || 45 || 36 || 208 || 114 || 322 || 126 || 32 || 1.9 || 1.5 || 8.7 || 4.8 || 13.4 || 5.3 || 1.3
|- style="background-color: #EAEAEA"
! scope="row" style="text-align:center" | 1996
|style="text-align:center;"|
| 16 || 11 || 20 || 11 || 88 || 135 || 47 || 51 || 14 || 1.8 || 1.0 || 8.0 || 4.3 || 12.3 || 4.6 || 1.3
|-
! scope="row" style="text-align:center" | 1997
|style="text-align:center;"|
| 16 || 8 || 5 || 8 || 35 || 19 || 54 || 15 || 2  || 0.6 || 1.0 || 4.4 || 2.4 || 6.8 || 1.9 || 0.3
|- class="sortbottom"
! colspan=3| Career
! 198
! 441
! 291
! 1757
! 822
! 2579
! 1058
! 161
! 2.2
! 1.5
! 8.9
! 4.2
! 13.0
! 5.3
! 0.9
|}

Media career and life after football 
When Brownless retired from football he moved into the media, appearing regularly on The Footy Show. On The Footy Show he appeared in "The House of Bulger" segment as the family's matriarch Joybell Bulger.

He joined 95.5 K-Rock in Geelong as a sales representative. Soon, on their "Big Mattress" breakfast show, he co-hosted a sport/comedy segment called "On The Bench" with ex-Geelong player Dwayne Russell and the Essendon fanatic "Ferret" (Russell Taylor), twice a week.  A long list of Geelong players were included in "On The Bench" as special guests including Barry Stoneham, Tim McGrath and Paul Couch.

In 1992 he became the inaugural winner of the Mirrool Silo Kick in the Riverina, kicking an Aussie Rules football 32 metres plus over the Mirrool Silos.

In August 1999, it was reported that due to Brownless' connections in the local political scene, both the Australian Labor Party (ALP) and the ruling Liberal Party of Australia were keen to recruit Brownless into politics, despite his limited experience. Labor leader Steve Bracks, who would go on to win the state election that year, was a Geelong supporter, and Brownless had persuaded the then Premier Jeff Kennett's wife, Felicity, to become Geelong's female number one ticket holder.

By 2005, Brownless had featured on The Sunday Footy Show as well as earning continual appearances on The Footy Show. He also co-hosted Morning Glory, a weekday breakfast show on Melbourne radio station SEN 1116. Brownless finished his 5-day-a-week stint in November 2008. Brownless appeared on Before the Bounce, a weekly football show on Foxtel alongside Jason Dunstall and Danny Frawley until the end of the 2008 AFL season.

In May 2008, Brownless was added as a regular on the Thursday night AFL Footy Show to replace an incapacitated Sam Newman, but he was relegated to guest panelist upon Newman's return. From 2009 until the show's termination in 2019, Brownless had once again become a regular alongside Shane Crawford to replace Trevor Marmalade, alternating each week with Crawford and, since 2012, Matthew Lloyd.

In March 2010, Brownless joined Triple M Melbourne's new drive show The Rush Hour with James Brayshaw.

Brownless bought the Cumberland Hotel in Castlemaine, Victoria. He also owns the Cremorne Hotel in Newtown, Victoria

In January 2020, Brownless appeared in the sixth season of the Australian version of I'm a Celebrity...Get Me Out of Here!.

In September 2021, Brownless announced he was leaving The Sunday Footy Show and the Nine Network after 27 years with the network.

Personal life
Brownless was married to Nicki. They have two daughters, Lucy and Ruby, and two sons, Oscar and Max. Brownless and Nicki made headlines in 2016 and beyond after it came to light that they had separated after 18 years of marriage in 2015, and that Nicki had proceeded to have a relationship with one of Brownless's colleagues, Garry Lyon. The relationship caused a bitter falling-out between Brownless and Lyon, causing Lyon to leave The Footy Show with depression.

See also

After-the-siren kicks in Australian rules football

References

Bibliography

External links

Profile at Australian Football

1967 births
Living people
Australian people of Irish descent
All-Australians (AFL)
New South Wales Australian rules football State of Origin players
Australian radio personalities
Australian television presenters
Geelong Football Club players
Australian rules footballers from Geelong
Australian rules footballers from New South Wales
Allies State of Origin players
I'm a Celebrity...Get Me Out of Here! (Australian TV series) participants